Naalli Petersen (15 March 1919 – 7 March 1997) was a Danish sailor. He competed in the Swallow event at the 1948 Summer Olympics.

References

External links
 

1919 births
1997 deaths
Danish male sailors (sport)
Olympic sailors of Denmark
Sailors at the 1948 Summer Olympics – Swallow